Founded in 2002 Native American Fatherhood and Families Association (NAFFA) is an Arizona based non-profit organization. 

Founder Albert M. Pooley, developed two different curriculums, Fatherhood is Sacred and Motherhood Is Sacred and Linking Generations By Strengthening Relationships.

References

“NAFFA’s Official Website”   -  http://www.nativeamericanfathers.org 
“About Parenting Article”   -   http://fatherhood.about.com/od/fatherhood-organizations/fl/Native-American-Fatherhood-and-Families-Association.htm 
“Responsible Fatherhood Day”  -  https://www.fatherhood.gov/about-us/events/national-native-american-responsible-fatherhood-day 
“Blog on NAFFA’s 5th Annual Conference”   -  http://globalfatherhooddialogue.blogspot.com/2010/06/native-american-fatherhood-and-families.html   
“ANA Agreement with NAFFA”   -  http://www.acf.hhs.gov/programs/ana/news/ana-announces-cooperative-agreement-with-native-american-fatherhood-and   
“Fatherhood Initiative Call PDF on NAFFA”   - 
https://duckduckgo.com/l/?kh=-1&uddg=http%3A%2%2Fwww.tapartnership.org%2Fdocs%2FcallNotes%2F20100311_FatherhoodCallNotes.pdf   
“Colorado Dads PDF – Agenda on Past NAFFA Conference”    -  
https://duckduckgo.com/l/?kh=-1&uddg=http%3A%2F%2Fwww.coloradodads.com%2FUserFiles%2FFile%2FNew_Agenda_2009.pdf   
“Department for Self Reliance to Facilitate Fatherhood is Sacred™ and Motherhood is Sacred™ Programs ”  -  
http://www.navajosquare.com/articles65/item/9230-department-for-self-reliance-to-facilitate-fatherhood-is-sacred-and-motherhood-is-sacred-programs

Parents' organizations
Native American organizations